Bhimtal (Kumaoni: Bhīmtāl) is a town and a nagar panchayat, near Nainital city in Nainital district in the state of Uttarakhand, India. It is situated at an altitude of 1370 meters above sea level and is about 22 kilometers from Nainital. The major attraction in Bhimtal is the Bhimtal Lake, which has an island at its centre. Besides tourism, Bhimtal has also now become a mini district headquarters since most of the district administration offices have shifted to the newly constructed Vikas Bhawan, the building complex for district administrative offices.

Bhimtal climate and weather
The climate of Bhimtal is pleasant and salubrious during summers but very cold during winters. Summer temperatures range from 15 °C to 29 °C, while winter temperatures range from 4 °C to 18 °C.

History
Bhimtal is an ancient place named after Bhima of Mahabharata. Bhimeshwara Mahadev Temple, an old Shiva temple on the bank of Bhimtal lake, is believed to have been built when Bhima visited the place during the banishment (vanvas) period of Pandavas. The present temple was built in the 17th century, by Baz Bahadur (1638–78 AD), a King of the Chand dynasty, and the Raja of Kumaon. British Library.6).

Bhimtal is older than nearby Nainital as the city of Nainital is just 150–160 years old. Bhimtal was a stoppage onroute on the old pedestrian road, which connects nearby Kathgodam to all Kumaon region and even to Nepal and Tibet. It might have been the part of the famous ancient silk route.

Places of interest

Near the Bhimeshwar temple is one of the source of river Gargi known as Gola Nadi in the region and originates from Garg Parvat or village Gagar in Nainital District.

About 2 km from Bhimtal is Nal Damyanti Tal, a small natural lake. It is believed that the palace of famous king Nala drowned into this lake. It is a very sacred place for the dwellers of the region.
About 5 km from Bhimtal is the famous group of lakes known as Sattal, which is a place of attraction for nature lovers. Fresh  water of lakes surrounded by thick forest and voice of birds is a wonderful experience. A hill near the lake known as Hidimba Parvat, named after the demon Hidimba of Mahabharata. Vankhandi Maharaj, a monk and environmentalist who lives on the hill, has created a sanctuary for the wild animals around the hill. The area is known as Vankhandi Ashram.

The hill of Karkotaka is named after Karkotaka, a mythical cobra. The hill is famous for its Nag temple in the region and on every Rishi Panchami thousands of people visit the temple and worship the Nag Karkotaka Maharaj. This is one of the famous nag temples situated in Uttarakhand region.

Sayad Baba ki mazar is a place where people from different part of Bhimtal and near around places come for worship on every Thursday. It is an example of unity in diversity as people from different religions (Hindu, Muslim, Sikh, Christian) visit this place. From this mazar, one can see whole lake, island, dam, and also nearby places like Jhangaliyagaon, Nakuchiyatal.

Attractions
Here the list of Attractions in Bhimtal.
Bhimtal Lake
Bhimtal Lake Aquarium
Bhimeshwar Mahadev Temple
Victoria Dam
Hidimba Parvat
Vankhandi Ashram
Nal Damyanti Tal
Sayad Baba Ki Mazar
Lok Sanskriti Sangralaya

Institutions

Government has constructed Vikas Bhawan building in Bhimtal and most of the District Administration offices of Nainital District are located in Vikas Bhawan complex.

There are many government and private institutions in Bhimtal, including Tasar Regional Research Center (Ministry of Textile, Govt. of India), National Cold Water Fisheries Institute, Jan Sikshan Sansthan, Birla Institute of Applied Sciences (an Institute of Higher Technical Education), Kumoun University Campus (Faculty of Management, Pharmacy & Bio-Technology) and District Institute of Teachers |Education (DITE).

Uttarakhand Graphic Era Parvatiya Vishwavidyalaya (Under the aegis of Graphic Era Educational Society, Dehradun and notified by the Government of Uttarakhand as a private university)  started its Kumaun campus in Bhimtal at Sattal Road from the session 2011–12 with B.Tech (in 5 branches of Electronics & Communication, Computer Science, Information Technology, Mechanical and Civil Engineering), MCA and MBA programmes, now known as Bhimtal campus of Graphic Era Hill University.

Government Model School (राजकीय आदर्श विद्यालय), Bhimtal, is the oldest school in the area, which is running for about 100 years from the British period. Lilawati Pant Inter College (popularly known as LP Inter College) and Government Girls Inter College (earlier Girls High School) are other Government educational institution in Bhimtal.

Sainik School in Ghorakhal near Bhimtal is a school where students prepare themselves to join the Indian Military. The Head of the school is a working officer from the Indian Air Force. In addition to that, Bhimtal has several other English medium schools. Hermann Gmeiner School is well known school at Bhimtal and is situated at Tallital, Bhimtal, it is famous for its school and an organisation (SOS Bhimtal). It is a co-educational school from Prep to XII standard with both boarding and day scholars. Mount Alvern Convent School, Lakes International School, Templeton Academy Naukuchiatal, Sarswati Public School are other schools in the area.

Demographics
 India census, Bhimtal had a population of 7722, a 31.46% increase in population compared to 2001. Sex ratio is 885. Bhimtal has an average literacy rate of 93.67%, higher than the national average of 74.04%; with male literacy of 95.28% and female literacy of 91.79%. 11% of the population is under 6 years of age. The major first language is Kumaoni.

See also
Bhimtal Lake
Pannatal Lake

References

 

 Cities and towns in Nainital district